Chaha in Iran may refer to:
Chaha, Bushehr
Chaha, Kohgiluyeh and Boyer-Ahmad